The R-7 family of rockets is a series of rockets, derived from the Soviet R-7 Semyorka, the world's first ICBM. More R-7 rockets have been launched than any other family of large rockets.

When Soviet nuclear warheads became lighter, the R-7 turned out to be impractical as a ballistic missile, and there were no other heavy payloads with a military application. However, long-term development has made the rockets useful in the Soviet, and later, Russian space programmes. Their purpose shifted primarily to launching satellites, probes, crewed and uncrewed spacecraft, and other non-threatening payloads. The R-7 family consists of both missiles and orbital carrier rockets. Derivatives include the Vostok, Voskhod and Soyuz rockets, which as of 2022 have been used for all Soviet, and later Russian human spaceflights.  The type has a unique configuration where four break-away liquid-fueled engines surround a central core.  The core acts as, in effect, a "second stage" after the other four engines are jettisoned. These rockets are expendable.

Later modifications were standardised around the Soyuz design. The Soyuz-2 is currently in use.

The Soyuz-FG was retired in 2019 in favour of the Soyuz-2.1a. R-7 rockets are launched from the Baikonur Cosmodrome, Plesetsk Cosmodrome, Guiana Space Centre (since 2011, see Soyuz at the Guiana Space Centre), and the Vostochny Cosmodrome (first launch 2016).

Summary of variants
All the R-7 family rockets are listed here by date of introduction. Most of the early R-7 variants have been retired. Active versions (as of 2022) are shown in green.

Korolev Cross

The Korolev Cross is a visual phenomenon observed in the smoke plumes of the R-7 series rockets during separation of the four liquid-fueled booster rockets attached to the core stage. As the boosters fall away from the rocket, they pitch over symmetrically due to aerodynamic forces acting upon them, forming a cross-like shape behind the rocket. The effect is named after Sergei Korolev, the designer of the R-7 rocket. When the rocket is launched into clear skies, the effect can be seen from the ground at the launch site.

See also
 1957 in spaceflight
 List of R-7 launches
 Comparison of orbital launchers families

References

External links 
 Rocket R-7  from S.P. Korolev Rocket and Space Corporation Energia, a Russian rocket and space contractor

 
Space launch vehicles of the Soviet Union
Soviet inventions
Rocket families
Space launch vehicles of Russia